Health and Physical Education Complex may refer to:
 Health and Physical Education Complex (BPCC), an athletic complex at Bossier City Community College
 Health and Physical Education Complex (FVSU), an athletic complex at Fort Valley State University
 Health and Physical Education Complex (SUSLA), an athletic complex at Southern University at Shreveport